"Don't Look Back" is a song co-written and recorded by American country music artist Gary Morris.  It was released in February 1982 as the second single from the album Gary Morris.  The song reached #12 on the Billboard Hot Country Singles & Tracks chart.  Morris wrote the song with Eddie Setser.

Chart performance

References

1982 singles
Gary Morris songs
Song recordings produced by Paul Worley
Warner Records singles
Songs written by Eddie Setser
1982 songs
Songs written by Gary Morris